The Wrong Trousers is a 1993 British stop-motion animated short film co-written and directed by Nick Park, featuring his characters Wallace and Gromit, and was produced by Aardman Animations in association with Wallace and Gromit Ltd., BBC Bristol, Lionheart Television and BBC Children's International. It is the second film featuring the eccentric inventor Wallace (voiced by Peter Sallis) and his dog Gromit, following A Grand Day Out (1989). In the film, a villainous penguin named Feathers McGraw uses Wallace and Gromit's robotic "Techno-Trousers" to steal a diamond from the city museum.
This was the last Wallace and Gromit film to have Wallace as the only spoken character.

The Wrong Trousers premiered in the United States on 17 December 1993, and the United Kingdom on 26 December 1993 on BBC Two. It was commercially successful, and won the Academy Award for Best Animated Short Film in 1994. It also inspired a charity fundraising day, known as "Wrong Trousers Day", one of several events.

The short was followed by two sequels, A Close Shave, released in December 1995, and A Matter of Loaf and Death released in December 2008. Feathers McGraw returns in the 2003 video game Wallace & Gromit in Project Zoo.

Plot

On Gromit's birthday, Wallace gives him two presents: a collar and lead set, and some robotic ex-NASA Techno-Trousers, which can take Gromit for walks. While Gromit is out on a forced "test run", Wallace, realising that he does not have enough money to pay the bills, decides to put an empty room in the house up for rent.

A penguin arrives to rent the room, but decides he likes Gromit's bedroom better. Unable to say no to a paying guest, Wallace moves Gromit into the empty room. The penguin takes an interest in the Techno-Trousers after watching Gromit use them to walk on walls and ceilings. By playing loud music all night, and taking up all of Wallace's time and affection, the penguin deliberately drives Gromit to run away from home. 

Once Gromit has gone, the penguin removes the controls from the Techno-Trousers and converts them into a portable remote. He then replaces Wallace's normal trousers with the Techno-Trousers, so that Wallace will accidentally put them on. Once Wallace is stuck in the "Wrong Trousers", the Penguin uses the remote to send Wallace running and jumping all over town, eventually exhausting him into a deep sleep. Meanwhile, Gromit notices a wanted poster for the criminal Feathers McGraw, supposedly a chicken but really the penguin in disguise. Noticing McGraw has been controlling the Techno-Trousers, Gromit begins to follow and spy on him, eventually returning to the house. His research confirms McGraw's identity and uncovers a plot to steal a huge diamond from a local natural history museum.

Gromit is detained when one of Wallace's inventions accidentally triggers. McGraw puts a special helmet on the sleeping Wallace's head and uses the remote to march the Techno-Trousers, with Wallace inside, to the museum. Directing the Techno-Trousers into the museum through the air vent, McGraw secures the diamond via a toy crane claw built into the helmet; however, Wallace awakens when a burglar alarm trips. Returning to the house with Wallace, McGraw holds him and Gromit at gunpoint, and attempts to flee with the diamond. An extended chase follows throughout the house atop Wallace's sprawling model train set; Wallace is eventually freed from the Techno-Trousers, and Gromit manages to capture McGraw in a milk bottle. McGraw is returned to his prison cell in the wall of the city zoo, and Wallace pays off all his debts with the reward money, throwing the Techno-Trousers into the rubbish. However, they walk off into the sunset on their own.

Cast
Peter Sallis as Wallace

Soundtrack alterations
In the original airing, first VHS release of the film and the 1999 DVD release, Gromit's birthday card plays "Happy Birthday to You".

In subsequent home video releases and airings, this was replaced with "For He's a Jolly Good Fellow" to avoid copyright infringements (likely due to this version of Happy Birthday being copyrighted). Also altered (again for reasons of copyright) are two specific songs from the penguin's radio, which were replaced with unidentified pieces of music, played through a Hammond organ. "Tie a Yellow Ribbon Round the Ole Oak Tree", also played through the same instrument, was left intact due to being in the public domain.

The pieces that were removed are "Happy Talk" from the musical South Pacific and "(How Much Is) That Doggie in the Window?", along with Wallace's singing of the latter during the subsequent morning. In addition, Gromit's television during breakfast no longer plays the Open University theme, although an announcer can still be heard saying, "Welcome to Open University".

However, the original soundtrack can still be heard in the background of the commentary track of the DVD release, although the Blu-ray release features the commentary track with the altered soundtrack. The original soundtrack can also be heard in non-English versions of the film.

Reception
The Wrong Trousers was voted as the eighteenth-best British television show by the British Film Institute. The film has an approval rating of 100% on Rotten Tomatoes, based on 26 reviews, and an average score of 9.10/10. The critical consensus reads, "An endearing and meticulous showcase of stop motion animation, The Wrong Trousers also happens to be laugh-out-loud funny."
The film was awarded the Grand Prix at the Tampere Film Festival, and the Grand Prix at the World Festival of Animated film – Animafest Zagreb in 1994. The Wrong Trousers won the Academy Award for Best Animated Short Film in 1994.

See also
 List of films featuring powered exoskeletons
 List of films with a 100% rating on Rotten Tomatoes

References

External links 

 
 

1990s animated short films
1990s stop-motion animated films
1993 animated films
1993 comedy films
1993 films
1990s heist films
1993 short films
Aardman Animations short films
Animated comedy films
Animated films about penguins
Animated films about animals
BBC Television shows
Best Animated Short Academy Award winners
British animated short films
Clay animation films
Films directed by Nick Park
Films set in museums
Films with screenplays by Bob Baker (scriptwriter)
Films with screenplays by Nick Park
Films about penguins
Stop-motion animated short films
Three-handers
Wallace and Gromit films
1990s English-language films
1990s British films